This is a list of notable people from Palo Alto, California. It includes people who were born/raised in, lived in, or spent portions of their lives in Palo Alto, or for whom Palo Alto is a significant part of their identity.

Actors

Visual arts

Fine artists

Designers

Business leaders and entrepreneurs

Musicians

William Ackerman, acoustic guitarist, founded influential New Age record label Windham Hill Records.
Joan Baez, folk singer went to school in Palo Alto and now resides in Woodside, California.
Lindsey Buckingham, musician, singer, songwriter, and producer, best known as lead guitarist and one of the vocalists of the musical group Fleetwood Mac, born and raised in Palo Alto
Doug Clifford, drummer of Creedence Clearwater Revival and Palo Alto native.
The Grateful Dead, rock "jam" band; early incarnations of band were based in Palo Alto.
Ron "Pigpen" McKernan, (1945–1973) founding member of the Grateful Dead; moved to Palo Alto as a teenager; buried at Alta Mesa Memorial Park.
Jerry Garcia, (1942–1995) founding member of the Grateful Dead; moved to Palo Alto in the 1960s.
Bill Kreutzmann, (born 1946) founding member and drummer of the Grateful Dead; born and raised in Palo Alto.
The Donnas, rock group, met while growing up in Palo Alto, Palo Alto High alumnus class of 1997.
Stephan Jenkins, rock musician with Third Eye Blind and Gunn High School alumnus class of 1983.
Ugly Kid Joe, rock band; members Whitfield Crane and Klaus Eichstadt grew up in Palo Alto, as did producer Eric Valentine
The Kingston Trio, folk group formed in Palo Alto while its members were enrolled at Stanford University and nearby Menlo College
Rick Nowels, pop music record producer and songwriter.
Virginia Seay, composer and musicologist, born in Palo Alto in 1922.
Grace Slick, singer with the rock group Jefferson Airplane, later known as Jefferson Starship
Matt Simons, singer-songwriter, born and raised in Palo Alto, graduated from Gunn High School in 2005.
Molly Tuttle, singer-songwriter, banjo player and guitarist, recording artist and teacher in the bluegrass tradition, was raised in Palo Alto and attended Palo Alto High School

Politicians, political figures and civil servants

Robert Bell, Virginia State Delegate, was born in Palo Alto.
Ron Christie, former advisor to Vice President Dick Cheney and political pundit
Jerry Daniels, CIA officer in Laos during the Vietnam War 
Herbert Hoover, the 31st President of the United States, starting in 1916 he maintained a home in Palo Alto.
Jon Huntsman, Jr., former governor of Utah and U.S Ambassador to China
Merrill Newman, (born 1928) Palo Alto Channing House resident, former United States Army officer, Korean War veteran, noted for his 2013 arrest in North Korea.
Condoleezza Rice, former U.S. Secretary of State
Thomas T. Riley, former U.S. Ambassador to Morocco
Manabendra Nath Roy, Indian nationalist and revolutionary
Byron Sher (born 1928), served in the California State Senate from 1996 to 2004, California State Assembly from 1980 and 1996 and a professor emeritus at Stanford Law School.
Sarah Wallis (1825–1905) The first President of the California Woman Suffrage Educational Association.
Ron Wyden, United States Senator

Religion 

 Indradyumna Swami (formally Brian Tibbitts) ISKCON Guru and a sannyasi for the International Society for Krishna Consciousness, born and raised in Palo Alto.
 John Duryea, former Palo Alto Catholic priest excommunicated by the church in the 1970s and author of his autobiography.
 Gerrit W. Gong, member of the Quorum of the Twelve Apostles of The Church of Jesus Christ of Latter-day Saints (LDS Church), raised in Palo Alto.

Scientists

Richard R. Ernst, Nobel laureate in chemistry, worked at Varian Associates in Palo Alto
Gene F. Franklin, control engineer and NASA scientist.
Michio Kaku, theoretical physicist, author, college professor. Attended Cubberly High School and while there built an atom smasher in his parents' garage.
Brian Kobilka, Nobel laureate in chemistry, lives in Palo Alto
Pamela Melroy, astronaut, second woman to command a space shuttle mission
 Maryam Mirzakhani (1977–2017), Iranian mathematician and professor of mathematics at Stanford University.
Ida Shepard Oldroyd, conchologist and curator (1856–1940)
Perley Ason Ross, physicist who worked on essential problems in the behaviour of X-rays
Robert Spinrad (1932–2009), computer pioneer as director of the Xerox Palo Alto Research Center.
William Shockley, Nobel laureate in physics and eugenicist
Sidney Dean Townley, astronomer and geodeticist, Stanford University professor emeritus.

Writers

Athletes

 Davante Adams NFL Player and wide receiver for the Las Vegas Raiders. East Palo Alto resident and Palo Alto High School graduate.
Harris Barton (born 1964), All Pro NFL offensive lineman
Matt Biondi (born 1965), swimmer, won a total of 11 Olympic medals (8 gold), born in Palo Alto
 Hunter Bishop (born 1998), baseball player
 Nick Bravin (born 1971), Olympic fencer
Jim Harbaugh, football player, head coach of Stanford, the San Francisco 49ers and Michigan, Palo Alto High School class of 1982
Tony Hargain, NFL player
Phil Hellmuth, professional poker player, regarded as one of the best, holds a record of 16 WSOP bracelets with total earnings of more than 25 million to date
Katie Hoff, Olympic swimmer, Palo Alto native
Adam Juratovac, Professional Football player, Arena Bowl XXIII Champion, Alumnus of Gunn High School
Dana Kirk, Olympic swimmer, coaches for Palo Alto Stanford Aquatics
Tara Kirk, swam with Palo Alto Stanford Aquatics, Olympic swimmer, American record holder in 100 and  breaststroke
Trajan Langdon, basketball executive and former player
Francie Larrieu-Smith, long-distance runner, first female athlete to make five Olympic teams, born in Palo Alto
Jeremy Lin (born 1988), basketball player, formerly for the NBA's Toronto Raptors, alumnus of Palo Alto High School
Jim Loscutoff, basketball player who won seven NBA championships with Boston Celtics
Don MacLean, UCLA and NBA basketball player
 Bob Melvin (born 1961), Major League Baseball player and manager
Joc Pederson (born 1992), baseball player, for San Francisco Giants.
Dan Petry, pitcher for 1984 World Series champion Detroit Tigers, born in Palo Alto
Tim Rossovich, professional football player
Dave Schultz, Olympic champion in freestyle wrestling, subject of film Foxcatcher
Mark Schultz, Olympic champion in freestyle wrestling, subject of film Foxcatcher
Pop Warner (early football player & coach) head coach 8 colleges including Stanford University (1924–1932), lived and died Palo Alto died (83) September 7, 1954 resided 251 Madrono Ave.
Charles Wright, professional wrestler, formerly working for WWE as Papa Shango and The Godfather
Steve Young, former professional football player for the San Francisco 49ers and NFL Hall of Famer.
Vincent Zhou, figure skater that attended the 2018 Winter Olympics.

See also 

 List of people from Oakland, California
 List of people from San Francisco
 List of people from San Jose, California
 List of people from Santa Cruz, California

References

Palo Alto, California